The FIA Foundation for the Automobile and Society is a foundation which undertakes  "[...] research into public policy issues relating to the automobile’s interaction with society. We support initiatives that improve the environmental performance of the car. The FIA Foundation also participates regularly in international institutions responsible for political and technical issues relating to road safety, sustainable mobility and the environment."

Among its official aims are to further "road safety" and "sustainable mobility".

"The FIA Foundation was established in 2001 with a donation of $300 million made by the Fédération Internationale de l'Automobile (FIA), the non-profit federation of motoring organisations and the governing body of world motor sport." The chairman of the foundation is Lord Robertson.

Critics see it as a tool of the motor industry to increase the acceptability of car-based traffic solutions while blocking alternatives.

See also
Make Roads Safe
ASEAN NCAP

References

Fédération Internationale de l'Automobile
Foundations based in England
Road safety
Sustainable transport